Docking protein 2 is a protein that in humans is encoded by the DOK2 gene.

Function 

The protein encoded by this gene is constitutively tyrosine phosphorylated in hematopoietic progenitors isolated from chronic myelogenous leukemia (CML) patients in the chronic phase. It may be a critical substrate for p210(bcr/abl), a chimeric protein whose presence is associated with CML. This encoded protein binds p120 (RasGAP) from CML cells.

Interactions 

DOK2 has been shown to interact with INPP5D and TEK tyrosine kinase.

References

Further reading